Pirenella incisa is a species of medium-sized sea snail or mud snail, a marine gastropod mollusk in the family Potamididae, the horn snails.

Distribution 
This is a vulnerable species (VU) in Japan.

Ecology
Pirenella incisa is a predominantly mangrove-associated species.

References

Further reading
 Lozouet P. & Plaziat J.C. (2008) Mangrove environments and molluscs. Abatan River, Bohol and Panglao Islands, central Philippines. Hackenheim: Conchbooks. 160 pp.
 Maki E., Ohtaki H. & Tomiyama K. (2002). "Distribution and substrate preferences among four batillariid and potamidid species, with observations on seasonal changes in the distribution of Cerithideopsilla djadjariensis (K. Martin, 1889) (Gastropoda: Potamididae)". Venus 61: 61-76.

External links 

Potamididae
Gastropods described in 1848
Taxa named by Jacques Bernard Hombron
Taxa named by Honoré Jacquinot